MS6, or similar, may refer to:
 Efini MS-6, a Japanese automobile
 Metal Slug 6, a video game
 Mississippi Highway 6
 Mississippi's 6th congressional district
 The Masked Singer (American season 6), an American television series